The L.D. Heater Music Company was a US musical instrument company in Portland, Oregon. The family-owned firm operated from 1918 to 1984 and focused on importing a range of instruments, specializing in guitars, violins, and brass instruments. The company was closed in 1986.

References

1918 establishments in Oregon
1984 disestablishments in Oregon
Companies based in Portland, Oregon
Manufacturing companies established in 1918
Manufacturing companies disestablished in 1984
Musical instrument manufacturing companies of the United States
Defunct music companies